Lisa Crystal Carver (born November 9, 1968, Dover, New Hampshire), also known as Lisa Suckdog, is an American writer known for her writing in Rollerderby. Through her interviews, she introduced the work of Vaginal Davis, Dame Darcy, Cindy Dall, Boyd Rice, Costes (her ex-husband with whom she performed as Suckdog), Nick Zedd, GG Allin, and Liz Armstrong to the public. A collection of notable articles from the zine was published as Rollerderby: The Book.

She started touring with the performance art band Psycodrama when she was 18 years old. It was also at this time that she became a  prostitute, which has been a major theme in her writings over the years. She began touring with Costes a year later, and would also tour without him when he was in France. She toured the U.S. and Europe six times, the last time in 1998. The noise music soap operas included audience interaction including dancing and mock-rape of audience members.

Carver is also the author of Dancing Queen: a Lusty Look at the American Dream, in which she expounds upon various relics of pop culture past, including Lawrence Welk, roller rinks, and Olivia Newton-John. In 2005, Soft Skull Press released Drugs Are Nice, detailing her early childhood and later romantic relationships with Costes, Boyd Rice (with whom she has a son) and Smog's Bill Callahan. In addition to writing her own zines and books, Carver has also written for various magazines (including Peter Bagge's comic book Hate) and kept a fictionalized journal about her sex life for the website Nerve. Although Carver no longer writes her journal for the site, she is still a semi-regular contributor. The online journal at Nerve was subsequently published in book form as The Lisa Diaries: Four Years in the Sex Life of Lisa Carver and Company.

2012 saw the release of Carver's treatise on the artistic career of Yoko Ono titled Reaching Out with No Hands: Reconsidering Yoko Ono (Backbeat Books). As of 2015, Carver has written a handful of pieces for website The Recoup. Her book, The Jaywalker, is a short story collection illustrated by long-time friend and collaborator Dame Darcy. Lisa, Dame Darcy, Maddie Kuzak, and Genevieve Kuzak toured parts of the world in 2016 to promote the book -- a performance art show reminiscent of the early 1990s Suckdog.

She also interviewed mixed martial arts fighter Brent Bergeron for an article that appeared in Vice magazine.

In 2017, Carver released Suckdog: A Ruckus (self published). This book, including 80+ photos and illustrations, looks back at Lisa's wild past onstage and behind-the-scenes.

Bibliography 
 Rollerderby: The Book (Feral House, 1996)
 Dancing Queen: a Lusty Look at the American Dream (Owlet, 1996)
 The Lisa Diaries: Four Years in the Sex Life of Lisa Carver and Company (Black Books, 2002)
  Drugs Are Nice (Soft Skull Press, 2005)
 no title (2011)
 Reaching Out with No Hands: Reconsidering Yoko Ono (Backbeat Books, 2012)
 How Not To Write (2015)
 Money's Nothing (2015)
 25 Lives (2015)
 Sadie, Wolf, and Friends (2015)
 The Jaywalker (2016)
 Suckdog: A Ruckus (2017)
 I Love Art (Tiger Bee Press, 2019)
 The Pahrump Report'' (Pig Roast Publishing, 2021)

References

External links
 
3 AM Magazine Interview
My Life in Xanax - Salon.com
Lisa Carver: "My Date with GG Allin," 1999, original publication unknown.

Living people
1968 births
American prostitutes
People from Dover, New Hampshire
American punk rock singers
Women punk rock singers
Punk writers
American non-fiction writers
American women writers